Tonny Mols (born 8 January 1969 in Eeklo) is a Belgian footballer who currently plays midfield for K.S.K. Maldegem.

Honours
 Belgian Cup Runner-up: 1
 2004–05

See also
 Dundee United F.C. season 1998–99

References

External links 
 
 Profile & stats - Lokeren

1969 births
Living people
Belgian footballers
Belgian expatriate footballers
Scottish Premier League players
Scottish Football League players
Dundee United F.C. players
Clyde F.C. players
Club Brugge KV players
R.W.D. Molenbeek players
K.S.C. Lokeren Oost-Vlaanderen players
Expatriate footballers in Scotland
Association football midfielders
People from Eeklo
Footballers from East Flanders